The Loggia degli Osii is a historical building of Milan, Italy. It is located in Piazza Mercanti, a central city square of Milan that used to be its centre in the Middle Ages.

History
It was built in 1321 by order of Matteo I Visconti, lord of Milan, who wanted a series of porticoes near the Palazzo della Ragione to house the judicial and notary activities of the city. The name derives from that of the Osii family, who held some palaces in the area before its construction. The Loggia was designed by  Scoto da San Gimignano.

Sentences and edicts were proclaimed by the Milanese judges from the Loggia's balcony (known as parlera), decorated with an eagle holding a prey, symbol of justice.

Description
The edifice has a Gothic style portico and loggia in the façade; not usual for the Milanese Gothic structures is the white and black marble decoration: this, more common in Genoa at the time, is perhaps a homage to Matteo Visconti's wife, Valentina Doria.

The two loggias are surmounted by a series of triple mullioned windows, housing statues. These were realized by Ugo da Campione and his son Giovanni, by other masters from Campione d'Italia and Tuscany, in the 14th century.

Sources

Buildings and structures completed in 1321
Buildings and structures in Milan
Loggias in Italy
Gothic architecture in Milan